There were many forms of repression in the Soviet Union carried out by the Soviet government and the ruling Communist Party.

Political repression in the Soviet Union
Ideological repression in the Soviet Union

Politics of the Soviet Union